Spiralinella marthinae is a species of sea snail, a marine gastropod mollusk in the family Pyramidellidae, the pyrams and their allies.

Taxonomy
Following Giannuzzi-Savelli et al. (2014) for generic allocation, but taking into account that Spiralinella is the valid generic name, not Partulida Schaufuss, 1869 (unavailable)

Distribution
This marine species occurs in the following locations:
 European waters (ERMS scope)
 Portuguese Exclusive Economic Zone
 Spanish Exclusive Economic Zone

References

External links
 To CLEMAM
 To Encyclopedia of Life
 To World Register of Marine Species

Pyramidellidae
Gastropods described in 1994